Rollins Creek may refer to:

Rollins Creek (Des Moines River), a stream in Missouri
Rollins Creek (Ray County, Missouri), a stream in Missouri